Charles Ottley Ellison  (8 February 1898 – 12 December 1978) was an Anglican ecclesiastic who was Archdeacon of Leeds from 1950 to 1969.

Ellison was educated at Wrekin College; the University of Leeds; and Ripon College Cuddesdon. During the First World War he was an Officer with the King's Own Yorkshire Light Infantry. He was ordained in 1933 and his first post was a curacy at St Chad, Far Headingley. He was Vicar of Kippax from 1937 to 1946; Rural Dean of Whitkirk from 1944 to 1946; Vicar of Wetherby from 1946 to 1955; and Vicar of Briggate from 1955 to 1965.

Notes

1898 births
1978 deaths
People educated at Wrekin College
Alumni of the University of Leeds
Archdeacons of Leeds
King's Own Yorkshire Light Infantry officers
British Army personnel of World War I